Guerreiros do Almirante (in English, Admiral Warriors) is the barra brava of Vasco da Gama. They are commonly known as Loucos da Saída 3 (in English, Exit 3 Mads), because of their localization in São Januário bleachers, and A Barra Mais Louca (in English, The Most Mad Barra), because of their passion, cheering unconditionally.

History 
After seen a poor support from Vasco da Gama fans in Copa do Brasil finals in 2006, friends started conversations about a creation of a new supporters group unnamed yet. It was decided that group would be a barra brava, unlike the common torcidas organizadas in Brazil. Guerreiros do Almirante was the chosen name and an Orkut community was created to meet people for the barra. The first Guerreiros reunion was on August 8. On August 16, Guerreiros appeared for the first time in a stadium, in a match against São Caetano in São Januário. On August 31, in a match against Ponte Preta in São Januário, Guerreiros premiered its musical instruments and barras (vertical rags).

Songs adaptations and compositions 
Guerreiros are known by their songs. Since its emergence, various songs to support Vasco da Gama appeared. The most famous is "Anna Julia Vascaína", a version of Los Hermanos hit "Anna Julia".

2014 boom and acknowledgement 
In December 2013, a shocking struggle between Atlético Paranaense's Os Fanáticos and Vasco da Gama's Força Jovem in Joinville resulted a one-year ban for these torcidas. The absence of the main torcida organizada of Vasco da Gama caused a Guerreiros increase, getting – even it can be temporarily – a main role in São Januário and other Brazilian stadiums.

Composition 
Guerreiros, like another barras brava, doesn't have a system association. Even that, sub-groups are common in Guerreiros. Normally these sub-group are identified by their territorial basis, like Centro, Baixada Fluminense, Macaé, Zona Oeste, Jacarepaguá (commonly known as Jabacreio), Leopoldina, Méier, Niterói-São Gonçalo, Ilha do Governador, Tijuca and São Cristóvão.

See also 
 Barra brava
 Vasco da Gama

References

External links 
 Guerreiros do Almirante website
 Guerreiros do Almirante on Facebook
 Guerreiros do Almirante on Instagram

CR Vasco da Gama
Association football culture
Association football supporters' associations